The HSBC Women's World Championship is a women's professional golf tournament on the LPGA Tour first held in 2008. It was played on the Garden Course of the Tanah Merah Country Club in eastern Singapore, adjacent to Singapore Changi Airport from 2008 to 2012. It is now played at the Sentosa Golf Club in Sentosa (Serapong Course from 2013 to 2016, Tanjong Course since 2017).

In 2008 and 2009, entrance in the tournament was open to 78 of the world's top golfers, based on world rankings, recent tour wins, and other criteria. The total purse in the first two years was US$2 million, with the winner's share at $300,000.  In 2010, the field was reduced to 63 players and the purse reduced to $1.3 million. The purse increased to $1.4 million in 2011.

The purse will increase from the $1.6 million in 2021, to $1.7 million in 2022.

As a limited field tournament, there is no cut and all players in the field play all four rounds.

Hong Kong-based financial services company HSBC is the title sponsor of the tournament. HSBC also sponsors several events like the WGC-HSBC Champions, Abu Dhabi HSBC Golf Championship and the former HSBC Women's World Match Play Championship and HSBC Brazil Cup.

2014 course layout
Sentosa Golf Club: Serapong Course

Winners

Tournament record

References

External links

Coverage on the LPGA Tour's official site
Sentosa Golf Club - official site

LPGA Tour events
Golf tournaments in Singapore
Women's Champions
Recurring sporting events established in 2008
2008 establishments in Singapore